New Zealand suffers from one of the worst rates of child poverty in the Western world. Child poverty affects 1 in 5, or roughly 210,500 children in New Zealand, as of the year ended June 2020 according to Statistics New Zealand. The number in 2011 was 285,000, as reported by the Child Poverty Action Group (Aotearoa New Zealand) (CPAG).  As inequality increased during the mid-2010s (exemplified by, among other things, a major housing crisis that began in Auckland), this figure increased to an estimated 295,000 children in 2016, which constituted one in six children in New Zealand. Child poverty has a disproportionately high effect on in Māori and Pasifika households, with a quarter (23.3%) of Māori children and almost a third (28.6%) of Pacific children living in poverty. These two ethnic groups struggle particularly due to the lingering effects of forced land alienation and immigration discrimination respectively. The Ministry of Social Development (New Zealand) recognises that:

For New Zealand, children in poverty lack material things enjoyed by other children, which results in their social exclusion and alienation. As a country which wishes each citizen's maximum potential productivity, more is expected than merely providing  the essentials. The needs child poverty advocates are most concerned with are children's safety and security, providing them with nutritious food, somewhere warm and dry to live, and giving them love and social contact so that they are provided with a sense of value. Consequences of child poverty in New Zealand include: poor health, such as lower rates of immunisation, higher rates of avoidable child mortality, infant mortality, low birth weight, and child injury; reduced participation in early childhood education and young people leaving school with no or low qualifications; and higher rates of youth suicide, teenage imprisonment, and the victimisation of children. Ideas challenging child poverty in New Zealand, including child-centred legislation, child specific representation in the decision making process, and creating a Minister for Children in New Zealand, have been purported as viable solutions to child poverty issues. Professor Marie Johansson, from Karolinska Children's Hospital in Sweden, after spending time working in Wellington, said that New Zealand needs to address child poverty as "

Background
The evolution of child poverty in New Zealand is associated with the 'Rogernomics' of 1984, the benefit cuts of 1991 and Ruth Richardson's "mother of all budgets", the child tax credit, the rise of housing costs, low-wage employment, and social hazards, both legal and illegal (i.e. alcoholism, drug addiction, and gambling addiction).

In 2004 26% of children were reported as living in serious or significant hardship, while at the same time only 4% of over-65 year olds were. The Working for Families (WFF) gave financial support to lower-middle income "working families with children", and saw child poverty fall from 28% in 2006 to 22% in 2007, and then again to 19% in 2008. However the poorest families were not being reached, and, Child Poverty Action Group argued, were being discriminated from obtaining a benefit which was "rightfully theirs".

In June 2011, while $9 billion was spent on the New Zealand superannuation fund, $1.7 billion was spent on the Domestic Purposes Benefit, which supported most of the 235,000 children in poverty, as well as their parents and caregivers.

The 2013 Budget offered small amounts of extra social policy spending, relevant to children's wellbeing, such as:
 
 Increased  spending  on  home  insulation  targeted  at  low-income  households  with children or elderly occupants or high health needs;
 Increased spending on rheumatic fever prevention; and
 Increased spending on early childhood education and schooling initiatives (although offset by other cutbacks in the sector).

In 2013 there was a conference held to address many of the issues that New Zealand has experienced: Children in Crisis Conference 2013. The conference was held to allow interested groups to discuss and seek evidence-based solutions to the current crisis. Key talking points were policy development, promoting reform, and publishing relevant articles. This was a three-day event that organised speakers and provided resources to current publications of that time. A full schedule of events and topics can be found on the conference website.The 2014 budget was announced on 15 May 2014.

Measuring child poverty

Relative
A poverty threshold based on 60% of median disposable household income was widely accepted before the Child Poverty Reduction Act 2018 was passed. Using this measure, the child poverty rate was 14% in 1982 and increased drastically and in 1994 the poverty rate for children was 29%. This peaked at 30% in 2001, and saw a decline to 22% in 2007. From 2009 to 2012 the poverty rate held steady at 25%. In 2016 the poverty rate dropped to 20%. From 1984 through 2012 ages 0–17 remained the most impoverished age group within New Zealand. The pushing factors for the increasing poverty rate were slow wage growth, high unemployment, and a decrease in social expenditures.

The Child Poverty Reduction Act 2018 provides for several, updated measures of relative and absolute poverty. The primary measurement is 50% of the median income after housing costs for the 2017/2018 base financial year (AHC) while supplementary measures consist of 50% of the median before deducting housing costs and 40% of the median income after deducting housing costs.

Absolute
Material hardship refers to children who live in households where their caregivers cannot afford items that are considered essential. In 2007 and 2008 the  deprivation rate among children was 18%, while it was 3% for those over 65 and 13% for the overall population. This is measured by calculating the proportion of households that lack three or more essential items out of a list of nine. The New Zealand Ministry of Social Development has created its own index to measure poverty based on material hardships: DEP-17, an index utilising 17 items that are considered essential for children. A score of 7+ is indicative of material hardship and a score of 9+ shows severe material hardship. The ministry collected data from 2008 to 2016. The highest rates of material hardship was seen in 2011 with households containing children aged 0–17 lacked 7+ items an average of 20% of the time and roughly 9% lacked 9+ items. These numbers steadily declined into 2016 where 12% of households lacked 7+ items and 6% lacked 9+ items.

Demographic considerations 
Studies have shown the Māori and Pasifika (other Pacific groups) consistently rank higher when considering impoverishment compared to other European ethnicities. There is also a consistent finding that poverty rates for younger children were higher than those aged 12–17. From 2007-2014 income poverty rates remained the highest in households that had multiple children. in 2014 household with three or more children made up 45% of impoverished children.

Overview of children's rights in New Zealand

A problem often encountered is that the rights of children are entangled with the rights of their parents and caregivers (limitations on which affect children).

Rights in New Zealand law
The Oranga Tamariki Act 1989 provides help services for children, their parents and family to help with child care responsibilities with the aim of preventing children suffering harm, ill-treatment, abuse, neglect, and deprivation.

The Domestic Violence Act 1995, which offers counselling for victims of domestic violence and section 5(2) requires victim protection, access to the court system in a speedy, inexpensive, and understandable way while also appropriate support programs.

The Care of Children Act 2004 concerns the best arrangements of guardianship/ care of children, recognising their rights (section 3), and with the best interests of children as paramount (section five).

Currently New Zealand is adapting the Vulnerable Children's Bill which is an omnibus bill intended to strengthen child protection, and make sure fewer children are abused and neglected.

The resources in the Family Court, and the Department of Child, Youth and Family, are minimal, causing long delays in hearings, investigation, and final cases.

Rights in international law
New Zealand ratified the United Nations Convention on the Rights of the Child (UNCROC) in 1993 with three reservations which still stand: Article 22.1 regarding the rights children with parents who are not legally allowed in New Zealand; Article 32.2 regarding the minimum age of employment; and Article 37 (c) regarding separate detainment facilities for children. Article 24 of UNCROC, which  stems from the right to health, requires states to provide measures aiming to reduce infant and child mortality, develop primary health care systems for children, combat disease and malnutrition, ensure pre and post natal care for mothers, spread awareness about child health and nutrition, including the advantages of breast feeding, hygiene and environmental sanitation, prevention of accidents.

Ten recommendations from the United Nations Human Rights Council Universal Periodic Review addressed child poverty issues in New Zealand.

Child poverty issues in New Zealand
In richer countries, such as New Zealand, poverty is not concerned with complete deprivation of essential resources. Rather it concerns limitations on resources, which prevents citizens from fully participating in society, and provokes their social exclusion.

Education
Child poverty undermines attempts for a secure education.

The New Zealand Education Act 1989 provides that state primary and secondary schooling is to be free. This is in accordance with article 26 of the Universal Declaration of Human Rights, Article 13 of the International Covenant on Economic, Social and Cultural Rights, Articles 28 and 29 of UNCROC, and Article 4 of UNESCO. The Human Rights Commission (New Zealand) reported in 2005 that some state schools were enforcing "compulsory donations", and there have been other reports of some state schools hiring debt collection agencies to pressure parents to pay these "donation fees."

The money spent by parents  on non-core  curriculum  activities, stationery and other material costs, and uniforms, is not taken into account.  
In Michelle Egan-Bitran's project, "This is how I see it: Children, young people and young adults' views and experiences of poverty", children and young people were found to be aware of these hidden costs of going to school, and the ability to not take part in school trips, for example, was important for those whose families could not afford holidays, as they felt they were missing out on opportunities to be a part of community activities.

Lack of access to right of education may result in other human rights abuses and perpetuate the Cycle of poverty.

From 2009-2016 the number of students leaving school with qualifications increased. The number of children leaving school with NCEA level 1 increased 8.5% and those achieving NCEA level 2 or higher increased 12.8% from 2009-2016. Mäori and Pasifika children are below the national average for receiving qualifications. However these groups have seen significant improvements over the stated time period. There is a correlation between the level of certification reached and the socioeconomic condition of the school. Schools in the lowest socioeconomic quintile in 2016 had 80% of children leave school with a NCEA level 1 or higher, whereas the highest quintile had about 95% of children reach this achievement. The disparity is much greater when comparing university entrance standards. About 38% of children attending schools in the lowest quintile achieved this while 67% of children attending schools in the highest quintile was able to leave school with this achievement.

Inequality
Differences in child well-being are more extreme in societies with greater income inequality. Conversely, countries with lower levels of inequality demonstrate higher levels of child well-being, and lower levels of child poverty. Inequality is known to affect a child's future life chances, health, education, and employment opportunities. Non-material inequality, such as a lack of voice, disrespect, shame, stigma, denial of rights and diminished citizenship, are all condensed for children.

Discrimination against beneficiary families
Of all New Zealand children, 22% live in families where the major caregiver receives income from a social security benefit. That is around 230,000, or one fifth, of New Zealand children  New Zealand has a long history of discrimination against, beneficiaries, especially the non-working poor.

The Working for Families (WFF) scheme, by lifting a family's income and making housing and childcare more affordable, was able to reduce child poverty. However, children whose parents cannot or will not work, are trapped in poverty and they miss out by association.
Debt collection against beneficiaries intensifies the poverty experienced by their children. When a beneficiary's over-payment charge is taken, be it for genuine fraud or because of a departmental mistake, money is taken from a family's already low income, and traps children, as well as their parents/caregivers, in a poverty cycle. The deduction taken reduces a child's food, clothing, and access to school and the community.
In New Zealand, Susan St John explained it is as though, 

Punishment for beneficiary fraud, often life repayments and in larger cases imprisonment, is a larger penalty suffered than others fraud offences in New Zealand.

In the case Osborne v Chief Executive of Ministry of Social Development [2010] 1 NZLR 559, the New Zealand High Court ruled that the 332 years that Linda Osborne would take to repay her debt was not of concern. It was also ruled the time spent she already in jail as punishment did not preclude any civil recovery of money. 
This system puts children's needs behind the ideologically driven desire to move sole parents (as well as other beneficiaries in the family) into paid work.
Claire Breen explains,

Child Poverty Action Group v Attorney General
In 2008 the Child Poverty Action Group (CPAG) took a case against the Attorney-General claiming provisions in the Income Tax Act 2007 were inconsistent with freedom from discrimination section 19 of the New Zealand Bill of Rights Act (NZBORA): this was the eligibility for tax credits under the WFF scheme. 
CPAG claimed it discriminated against children in families who would be eligible if it were not for the receiving of income benefit, or weekly compensation under the Injury Prevention, Rehabilitation and Compensation Act 2001, by one of the family members.

The Human Rights Tribunal found that, 

The Court of Appeal (CA) recognised as an, 
It was concluded that as under section 19 of the New Zealand Bill of Rights Act beneficiaries subject to the off-benefit rule were subject to 'prima facie' discrimination. However, the CA also found that it was "justified discrimination" on the ground of employment status, as dictated by a democratic system.

Neglect and maltreatment

27% of New Zealand children (over a quarter) have witnessed family violence against an adult in the home. Children suffer from stress and disruption when they have to leave home because of domestic violence, and it also disrupts their education. Aviva family violence services explains that, 
108 children aged 0–14 died from intentional injuries from neglect, assault, or maltreatment. From 2010-2014 it was found that 57% of all cases were female. When considering age groups during the same time period 57% of all deaths occurred during the first year of life. Contrary to death from intentional injuries where there was no statistically significant difference found on yearly numbers, hospitalisations due to neglect and maltreatment has seen an overall decrease 2001-2016. The total number of hospitalisations for children 0-14 for injuries resulting from neglect was about 225 in 2001 and there was approximately 160 cases in 2016. The most common injury resulting in hospitalisation was head injury and the highest number of cases were seen in children under the age of 1.

Shine's Safe@Home project is one solution that has been set up. It offers security upgrades for homes, allowing children to stay at home, and not have their lives disrupted. The project limits success to break in-attempts of potential perpetrators by changing locks and providing an alarm system that is linked top the police. The overall goal of the project is to prevent victimisation, increase health and well-being, and make the home a safer place. The project has been seen as an overall success, and Yolanda Meima has advocated for the program to be implemented at the national level.

Health
In 2010, 150 children died because of preventable diseases. In the documentary "Inside Child Poverty: a special report", Dr Bryan Beatty, a General Practitioner in East Porirua, reported seeing chest infections, skin infections, and upper respiratory infections. The documentary also pictured serious cases of scabies, and school sores. One out of a hundred children in New Zealand have a heart disease which is caused by rheumatic fever, which is caused by an untreated sore throat, and can lead to heart complications. New Zealand immunisation rates were placed 23rd out of 25 Organisation for Economic Co-operation and Development (OECD) countries by UNICEF, there are also higher rates of vaccine preventable diseases than in many similar countries  Not only is this preventable harm and pain, but children's health affects their education and their future employment outcomes as adults. The numbers for infant deaths within the first year of life were constant from 2006 through 2013. These numbers remain above the OECD average. In 2014 the infant mortality rate was comparable to the United States. The groups most affected by sudden unexpected death in infancy are the Māori and Pasifika groups. There are several other medical conditions with social gradient within the country: Asthma, bronchiolitis, and gastrointestinal diseases. An average of 28 children aged 0–14 died each year from 2010-2014 due to such diseases, and an average of 41,000 hospitalisations occurred from 2011-2015 for the same age group.

Housing
In 2010 25,000 children, mostly from lower-income families, where admitted to hospital for preventable respiratory infections aggravated by poor houses. In New Zealand many of the health problems are related to the quality of New Zealand houses and housing standards in New Zealand, and overcrowding. Dr Michael Baker, Associate Professor of Public Health at Otago University, recognises household crowding as the main risk factors for meningocele disease, rheumatic fever, and tuberculosis. This is an issue that greatly affects children as 75-80% of crowded households had children living in them. The highest levels of crowding seen from 2013-2015 were children ages 0–17 living in social housing. 33% of children living in social housing experienced overcrowding. Other issues of concern include dampness, mold, and having heat during the winter. Approximately 63% of households with children experienced major problems with damp and mold between 2013 and 2015 and approximately 75% of had major issues keeping the home warm during the winter. The greatest amount of all issues were seen in social housing. Housing costs influence directly the poverty experienced in low-income households with children.

Children's Commissioner 2013 recommendations 
The Office of the Children's Commissioner (OCC) laid forth 78 separate recommendations in their 2012 report Solutions to Child Poverty in New Zealand evidence for action. These recommendations are grouped into several categories:

Strategy and accountability 
The OCC recommended to enact legislation that would help reduce child poverty in the country. This included legislation that would create fiver different measurements of poverty to build an accurate account of the situation, setting short and long term targets that would be reviewed at least every three years, and accelerating the rate of poverty reduction for heavily affected groups such as the Mäori and Pasifika.

Tax credits and income support 
They recommended changing how the family-tax credit is calculated. They want to see a higher tax credit for those aged 0–5, because research indicates that investing in child development at this age is crucial. This would be done incrementally to avoid financial struggle. They also recommended to eliminate differential payments based on the number of child in each household, and initially provide a flat rate for all children under the age of 16. In order to further help reduce poverty they want experts hired that specialise in child development in relation to the labor supply, all child-related benefits be reviewed to ensure they help in reducing poverty, and in the long-term create a new income support plan that would replace many of the preexisting government subsidies.

Child support 
The OCC wished to see child-support payments to single-parent families who were receiving government support to still go to the parent. At the time all child-support payments made to parents in this situation were withheld by the government to offset the cost of government assistance. They also wished to force the government to make advanced child support payments when the non-custodial parent did not make the payments on time.

Employment and training 
It was recommended that the government work with current industries to create a pathway for parents with low or no skills to attain training and education. This included a vocational pathway to ease the transition between secondary school and the workforce. They also wish to see a larger collaboration with the government and industry to ensure more family-friendly work environments. This is to ensure that there is a better overall work-life balance than previously existed. The idea of evaluating current unemployment programs for effectiveness was also proposed. The last thing recommended in this category was a low-interest loan be offered by the government for those looking to re-enter the workforce and in dire need of financial support.

Housing
The OCC stresses for a need of government monitoring for all rental units to ensure minimum health and safety standards are being met. Due to a serious lack of affordable housing they said that there needed to be an increase in social housing: They suggested that 2,000 units be added per year until 2020. They wanted better supervision for those companies providing social housing to include government monitoring for quality, accessibility, and financial stability. They wanted the government to create a point of contact separate from the housing agencies to properly assess housing needs. Finally they wished to see further research be funded for housing needs and how it affects children.

Māori and Pasifika children 
The recommendation is for the government to take the necessary steps to reduce poverty levels within the Māori and Pasifika ethnic groups. They wanted the housing issues to e addressed for these communities, improved education, more people successfully transitioning to meaningful employment, enhanced health initiatives, and continued investment in research to properly address the issues at hand.

Debt 
It was asked that the government consider income levels when enforcing debt payment to government agencies. This is to ensure that necessary funds are taken away from children that are already considered to be in poverty. It was also asked that the government provide education on how to properly budget a household income. Again it is recommended by the OCC that the government help establish a low or zero interest loan to allow low-income families to have affordable debt.

Health
The OCC advocated for a universal health assessment and implementation plan for children 0-5. The goal of this was to increase co-coordination between professionals, and ensure that a child would get the needed level at care no matter what professional they were seen by. It was suggested that there was a need for services to be provided on an as-need basis. Initially all children would receive the basic care that all children require, and if it was determined that if any extra care was required during childhood that it would be provided. It is also stated that there was a need to develop a national nutrition strategy as poor nutrition has historically been an issue within New Zealand. In hopes, these improvements in healthcare would eventually lead to free primary care for all children aged 0–17.

Education
It was highly encouraged that a food-in-school program be implemented. A survey conducted in 2010 had found that over 20 percent of children did not have enough food for healthy active living. There was also a call for state funded health services within all secondary schools in order to alleviate some issues commonly seen with young people living in poverty including mental health issues, teen pregnancies, and drug and alcohol abuse. The OCC also recommended the government to expand before-school, after-school, and holiday programs for children living in poverty. This initiative would allow children to attain a proper education, while allow parents to competitively be involved in the labor market.

Local communities and families 
The OCC recommends to evaluate current poverty-reducing activities already being implemented by communities throughout New Zealand. Once it finds the most effective activities it is encouraged that the government use this as a baseline for future programs. It is also suggested that parks and public spaces need to be welcoming to children. This is to ensure that children living in poverty can find safe space, even if it not available in the home environment. They also advised the government to support parenting programs so that even if individuals find themselves in a low-income situation they can still be positive role models for their children.

See also
New Zealand Child and Youth Epidemiology Service
Office of the Children's Commissioner
 Children's Commissioner Act 2003
Child, Youth and Family (New Zealand)
Human rights in New Zealand
KidsCan
Poverty in New Zealand
Welfare in New Zealand

References

Sources

Further reading
 Child Counts, "Assessing the impact of new legislation on children: Every Child Counts Briefing Sheet for MP's no.1" (June 2010)   
 Ludbrook, Robert, and Jamison, Andrea, "Kids Missing out" (UNICEF New Zealand, 4 December 2013) 
 Shirlaw, Nicola, "Children and the Christchurch Earthquakes" (Child Poverty Action Group, Auckland, February 2014) 

Children's rights in New Zealand
Human rights in New Zealand
Child poverty
Poverty in New Zealand